Chen Hong (born November 28, 1979 in Changting County, Fujian) is a former Chinese badminton player.

Career
During the first several years of the 21st century Chen rated among the world's leading singles players, achieving a number one world ranking in 2002–2003. He won the Swedish Open and the Asian Championships in 1999 as a nineteen-year-old. His subsequent titles included the Dutch (2000), Singapore (2002, 2003), Denmark (2002, 2006), Malaysia (2003), China (2005, 2006), and Thailand (2007) Opens. He twice captured the prestigious All-England Championships, 2002 and 2005, defeating his very formidable fellow countryman Lin Dan in the final on the second occasion. He played in the All England 6 consecutive times between 2001 and 2006, his first All England reached the final, losing out to Indian player Pullela Gopichand, 15-12 15–6. His performances at IBF World Championships and at the 2004 Olympic Games were not among his finest. He was a bronze medalist (semifinalist) at the 2001 and 2006 World Championships and was eliminated in the quarterfinals of the Games in Athens. At the 2006 IBF World Championships Chen recorded a 303 km/h jump smash against Taufik Hidayat. Chen retired from competitive play in 2007.

Achievements

World Championships 
Men's singles

World Cup 
Men's singles

Asian Championships 
Men's singles

IBF World Grand Prix 
The World Badminton Grand Prix sanctioned by International Badminton Federation (IBF) from 1983 to 2006.

Men's singles

External links
 
 
 
 

1979 births
Living people
People from Longyan
Hakka sportspeople
Badminton players from Fujian
Olympic badminton players of China
Badminton players at the 2004 Summer Olympics
Asian Games medalists in badminton
Badminton players at the 2002 Asian Games
World No. 1 badminton players
Chinese male badminton players
Asian Games bronze medalists for China
Medalists at the 2002 Asian Games
Universiade medalists in badminton
Universiade silver medalists for China
Universiade bronze medalists for China
Medalists at the 2007 Summer Universiade
21st-century Chinese people
20th-century Chinese people